Dewald Botha (born 23 September 1991) is a South African cricketer who currently plays for Boland. He is a right-handed batsman and right-arm off break bowler. Botha made his first-class debut on 10 February 2011 against Northerns. He was included in the Boland cricket team squad for the 2015 Africa T20 Cup.

References

External links
Dewald Botha profile at CricketArchive

1991 births
Living people
Cricketers from Bellville, South Africa
South African cricketers
Boland cricketers